Sitara is a 1980 Indian Hindi-language film directed by Meraj, with Mithun Chakraborty, Zarina Wahab. The music was composed by R. D. Burman. The film was a remake of the Telugu film Seetamalakshmi.

Plot 

Sitara is the love story of two childhood lovers, Dhania and Kundan. They come to Bombay, due to their economic conditions and they start working in a Cinema hall. Dhania is fascinated by films and has hidden desire to become an actress, so she often imitates the dances shown on movies. One day Dhania plays the record of the songs and starts dancing, assuming herself as the heroine of the film. She pulls Kundan up to join her and both get involved in the dance, forgetting everything. One person related with films watches them and he is impressed by the skill of Dhania and he helps her to become a film star Sarita from Dhania. Now Kundan feels lonely in this glamorous world and their love is lost somewhere. He still loves her, but she is lost in her dreams of becoming a superstar. Depressed, Kundan decides to return to his village. Sitara explores the life of actors coming from small towns and villages.

Cast 

Mithun Chakraborty as Kundan
Zarina Wahab as Dhania
Kanhaiyalal
Agha
Dinesh Thakur
Paintal
Yunus Parvez
Mac Mohan

Soundtrack 
The music was composed by R. D. Burman. The lyrics were written by Gulzar.

References

External links 
 

1980 films
1980s Hindi-language films
Films about actors
Films scored by R. D. Burman
Films set in Mumbai
Hindi remakes of Telugu films